The 1987–88 Algerian Championnat National was the 26th season of the Algerian Championnat National since its establishment in 1962. A total of 18 teams contested the league, with EP Sétif as the defending champions, The Championnat started on September 11, 1987 and ended on July 5, 1988.

Team summaries

Promotion and relegation 
Teams promoted from Algerian Division 2 1987-1988 
 US Bel-Abbès
 RS Kouba
 MO Constantine

Teams relegated to Algerian Division 2 1988-1989
 Entente de Sétif
 Olympique de Chlef
 Jeunesse de Belcourt
 Widad de Tlemcen
 Flambeau de Skikda

League table

References

External links
1987–88 Algerian Championnat National

Algerian Championnat National
Championnat National
Algerian Ligue Professionnelle 1 seasons